Mosylon, also known as Mosullon, was an ancient proto-Somali trading center on or near the site that later became the city of Bosaso.

History
Mosylon was the most prominent emporium on the Red Sea coast, as outlined in the Periplus of the Erythraean Sea. With its large ships, it handled the bulk of the cinnamon trade arriving from the ports of ancient India. Dioscorides consequently noted that the city became known as the source of the best variety of the spice in the ancient world. A specific species of cinnamon exported from the harbour was known as Mosyllitic. Due to its high quality and rarity at the time in Ancient Rome, the imported cinnamon was typically deposited in the Romans' Royal Treasury.

According to classical writers such as Pliny and Herodutus, the inhabitants of Mosylon imported flint glass and glass vessels from Ancient Egypt, unripe grapes from Diospolis, unmilled cloths for the Berberi markets, including tunics and cloths manufactured at Arsinoe, as well as wine and tin. The main export items were gums, tortoise shells, incense and ivory. Pliny also indicated that, en route to the cinnamon hub of Mosylon, the Egyptian Pharaoh Sesostris led his forces passed the Port of Isis. The latter ancient local commercial center is believed to correspond with the town of Bulhar, situated near Zeila.

See also
Essina
Hantaara
Malao
Sarapion
Booco
Opone
Qandala
Heis
Cape Guardafui
Somali maritime history
History of Somalia

References

Ancient Somalia
African civilizations
Maritime history of Somalia
Ancient Greek geography of East Africa